The White Lotus is a syncretic religious and political movement which forecasts the imminent advent of the "King of Light", i.e., the future buddha Maitreya. As White Lotus sects developed, they appealed to many Han Chinese who found solace in the worship of the Queen Mother of the West (or the "Birthless Old Mother" ).

History

Origin 
The religious background of the White Lotus Sect goes back to the founding of the first White Lotus Society in the Donglin Temple at Mount Lu by the Huiyuan (334–416 CE). During the Northern Song period (960–1126), White Lotus Societies were founded throughout southern China, spreading Pure Land teachings and meditation methods with them. Between 9th and 14th centuries, Chinese Manichaeans increasingly involved themselves with the Pure Land school. Through this close interaction Manichaeism had profound influence on Chinese Maitreyan Buddhist sects within the Pure Land tradition, practicing together so closely alongside the Buddhists that the two traditions became indistinguishable.

Later development 
During the 12th century a Buddhist monk, Mao Ziyuan (Dharma name: Cizhao), later developed the White Lotus School in order to connect the scattered White Lotus Societies. He erected a Lotus Repentance Temple where he preached the teachings of the White Lotus School, which became the basis of the White Lotus religion. This White Lotus religion was a hybrid movement of Buddhism and Manichaeism that emphasised Maitreya teachings and strict vegetarianism; its permission for men and women to interact freely was considered socially shocking.

Development into a secret society 
During the late thirteenth century, the Mongol Yuan dynasty's rule over China prompted small yet popular demonstrations against its rule. As they grew into widespread dissent, adherents of White Lotus took part in some of these protests, leading the Yuan government to ban the White Lotus religion as a heterodox religious sect, forcing its members to go underground. Now a secret society, the White Lotus became an instrument of quasi-national resistance and religious organisation. This fear of secret societies carried on in the law; the Great Qing Legal Code, which was in effect until 1912, contained the following section:
 Like other secret societies, they covered up their unusual or illicit activities as "incense burning ceremonies".

White Lotus Revolution 

The White Lotus was a fertile ground for fomenting rebellion.

A Buddhist monk from Jiangxi named Peng Yingyu began to study the White Lotus and ended up organizing a rebellion in the 1330s. Although the rebellion was put down, Peng survived and hid in Anhui, then reappeared back in South China where he led another unsuccessful rebellion in which he was killed. This second rebellion changed its colours from white to red and its soldiers were known as the "Red Turbans" for their red bandanas.

Another revolution inspired by the White Lotus society took shape in 1352 around Guangzhou. A Buddhist monk and former boy-beggar, the future Ming dynasty founder Zhu Yuanzhang, joined the rebellion. His exceptional intelligence took him to the head of a rebel army; he won people to his side by forbidding his soldiers to pillage in observance of White Lotus religious beliefs. By 1355 the rebellion had spread through much of China.

In 1356, Zhu Yuanzhang captured the important city of Nanjing (then called Jiqing) and made it his capital, renaming it Yingtian. It was here that he began to discard his heterodox beliefs and so won the help of Confucian scholars who issued pronouncements for him and performed rituals in his claim of the Mandate of Heaven, the first step toward establishing a new dynastic rule.

Meanwhile, the Mongols were fighting among themselves, inhibiting their ability to suppress the rebellion. In 1368, Zhu Yuanzhang extended his rule to Guangzhou, the same year that the Mongol ruler, Toghon Temür, fled to Karakorum. In 1368, Zhu Yuanzhang and his army entered the former capital of Beijing and in 1371 his army moved through Sichuan to the southwest.

By 1387, after more than thirty years of war, Zhu Yuanzhang had liberated all of China. He took the title Hongwu Emperor and founded the Ming dynasty, whose name echoes the religious sentiment of the White Lotus.

Birthless Old Mother 
Despite their involvement in overthrowing the Yuan dynasty and therefore in the founding of Ming dynasty, the White Lotus did not cease its political activities against Chinese authorities; consequently, it remained prohibited during the Ming dynasty. Since they were prohibited from establishing a central authority, no doctrinal orthodoxy could be enforced, allowing their teachings and practices to increasingly diversify. While Maitreya remained the central figure for most White Lotus sects, during the reign of the Zhengde Emperor (1506–1521) a new deity began to grow in popularity among White Lotus adherents, namely Queen Mother of the West (or the "Birthless Old Mother" ). Originating from the Daoist Chinese folk religion, she was identified as the transcendent Buddha who never incarnated but exists without coming into being or transforming into non-being, but was nevertheless foretold to come down upon earth to gather all her children at the millennium into one family and guide them safely back to Heaven, the "home of the true emptiness".

Wang Lun uprising 

The White Lotus reemerged in the late 18th century in the form of an inspired Chinese movement in many different forms and sects.

In 1774, the herbalist and martial artist Wang Lun founded a derivative sect of the White Lotus that promoted underground meditation teachings in Shandong province, not far from Beijing near the city of Linqing. The sect led an uprising that captured three small cities and laid siege to the larger city of Linqing, a strategic location on the north–south Grand Canal transportation route. After initial success, he was outnumbered and defeated by Qing troops, including local armies of Chinese soldiers known as the Green Standard Army.

An account of Wang Lun's death was given to Qing authorities by a captured rebel. Wang Lun remained sitting in his headquarters wearing a purple robe and two silver bracelets while he burned to death with his dagger and double-bladed sword beside him.

Wang Lun likely failed because he did not make any attempts to raise wide public support. He did not distribute captured wealth or food supplies, nor did he promise to lessen the tax burden. Unable to build up a support base, he was forced to quickly flee all three cities that he attacked in order to evade government troops. Though he passed through an area inhabited by almost a million peasants, his army never measured more than four thousand soldiers, many of whom had been forced into service.

White Lotus Rebellion 

Beginning in 1794, two decades after Wang Lun's failed uprising, a movement also arose in the mountainous region that separates Sichuan from Hubei and Shaanxi in central China as tax protests. Here, the White Lotus led impoverished settlers into rebellion, promising personal salvation in return for their loyalty. Beginning as tax protests, the eventual rebellion gained growing support and sympathy from many ordinary people. The rebellion grew in number and power and eventually, into a serious concern for the government.

A systematic program of pacification followed in which the populace was resettled in hundreds of stockaded villages and organized into militia. In its last stage, the Qing suppression policy combined pursuit and extermination of rebel guerrilla bands with a program of amnesty for deserters. The rebellion came to an end in 1804. A decree from the Daoguang Emperor admitted, "it was extortion by local officials that goaded the people into rebellion..." Using the arrest of sectarian members as a threat, local officials and police extorted money from people. Actual participation in sect activities had no impact on an arrest; whether or not monetary demands were met, however, did.

Eight Trigrams uprising 

In the first decade of the nineteenth century, there were also several White Lotus sects active in the area around the capital city of Beijing. Lin Qing, another member of the Eight Trigrams sect within the White Lotus, united several of these sects and with them build an organization that he would later lead in the Eight Trigrams uprising of 1813.

Administrators also seized and destroyed sectarian scriptures used by the religious groups. One such official was Huang Yupian, who refuted the ideas found in the scriptures with orthodox Confucian and Buddhist views in A Detailed Refutation of Heresy ( Pōxié Xiángbiàn), which was written in 1838. This book has since become an invaluable source in understanding the beliefs of these groups.

Second Sino-Japanese War 
White Lotus adherents who collaborated with the Japanese during the Second Sino-Japanese War (1937–1945) were fought against by the Muslim General Ma Biao.

Uses of the term "White Lotus" in later periods 
While traditional historiography has linked many Maitreyist and millenarian uprisings during the Ming and Qing dynasties as all related to the White Lotus, there are reasons to doubt that such connections existed. B. J. Ter Haar has argued that the term "White Lotus" became a label applied by late Ming and Qing imperial bureaucrats to any number of different popular uprisings, millenarian societies or "magical" practices such as mantra recitation and divination. If this interpretation is correct, the steady rise in the number of White Lotus rebellions in imperial histories during the Ming and Qing does not necessarily reflect the increasing strength of a unified organization. Instead, this trend reflects a growing concern by imperial bureaucrats with any form of Buddhism practiced outside of the sanctioned frameworks of the monasteries.

Tiandihui and the Triads 
The White Lotus sect may have been one of the main ancestors of the Chinese organizations known as the Triads. The Triads were originally members and soldiers of the Tiandihui or "Heaven and Earth Society" during the period of the war between the Ming and Qing dynasties. The Triads' formation was not for criminal purposes, but to overthrow the Qing and restore the Ming to power. The White Lotus Society may have been one of five branches of the Heaven Earth Society which formed at the Shaolin Monastery from Ming loyalists. The Five Branches, known by some as the "Five Ancestors", were the Black, Red, White, Yellow and Green Lodges. After there was no longer any need for the triads on the battlefield, some high-level military leaders resorted to criminal activity in order to find means of survival.

Popular culture 
 In the martial-arts movie Once Upon a Time in China II, members of the White Lotus are featured as antagonists.
 Another martial-arts movie White Lotus Cult, featured members of the White Lotus as antivillains who supported the Empress Dowager in resisting the resulting foreign invasion; reminiscent of the 1915 American film, The Birth of a Nation.
 The martial-arts movie Clan of the White Lotus, features "Priest White Lotus" as the main villain, who is seeking revenge after the death of his brother Pai Mei.
 Avatar: The Last Airbender, an animated television series produced by Nickelodeon, features a secret society named the Order of the White Lotus.

See also 
 Chinese Buddhism
 Chinese Manichaeism
 Ming Cult
 Pure Land Buddhism
 Secret society
 Xiantiandao
 Yiguandao

References

Bibliography 

 
 
 
 
 
 
 
 
 
 
 

Chinese Manichaeism
Chinese salvationist religions
Chinese secret societies
Heresy in Buddhism
History of Buddhism in China
Ming dynasty
Paramilitary organizations based in China
Triad (organized crime)
Vegetarianism in China